Dojlidy is a district of the city of Białystok, Poland, formerly a village.

Dojlidy may also refer to:
Dojlidy Brewery, Białystok, Poland and its brands of beer
Dojlidy-Kolonia, village in the administrative district of Gmina Zabłudów, within Białystok County. Poland
Former name of Żubr (beer), Polish lager

See also